Darakhtbid (also Romanized as Darakhtbīd) is a village in Abarshiveh Rural District, in the Central District of Damavand County, Tehran Province, Iran. At the 2006 census, its population was 10, in 4 families.

References 

Populated places in Damavand County